Surobi, Sarobi or Sarubi District is a district of Paktika Province, Afghanistan, with a population of 48,291 people. It is situated northeast of Gomal, west of Barmal and south of Urgun and Sar Hawza. The Kharoti tribe of Ghilji Pashtuns have a strong presence here.

References 

Districts of Paktika Province